Tamerlane was launched in 1769 in Bermuda. She first appeared in British records in 1788 and then carried out three voyages as a whaler in the British Southern Whale Fishery. Next, she made one voyage as a slave ship. French frigates captured and burnt her in 1794.

Career
Tamerlane, Basset, master, arrived at Gravesend from Nova Scotia on 14 September 1788. Tamerlane first appeared in Lloyd's Register (LR) in 1789.

Tamerlane made three voyages as a whaler in the Southern Whale Fishery.

1st whaling voyage (1789–1790): Captain William Simpson sailed in 1789 and returned on 17 August 1790. She had sailed to the Africa Grounds and returned from the Brazil Banks.

2nd whaling voyage (1790–1791): Captain Smith sailed in 1790 and returned on 1790 and returned on 17 August 1791. She sought whales off the coasts of Guinea and Patagonia.
 
3rd whaling voyage (1791–1792): Captain Snell sailed on 11 October 1791, was at Portsmouth on 18 October, and returned to Gravesend on 17 May 1792. She had been whaling around the Falkland Islands.

Tamerlane next made one voyage as a slave ship. Captain Robert White sailed from Liverpool on 17 January 1793, bound for West Africa. She arrived at Kingston, Jamaica on 14 September with 194 slaves. At some point Captain Robert Mule replaced White. While Tamerlane was still at sea Gill Slater, one of her two owners, went bankrupt. (The other owner was William Dickson.)

Fate
On 12 August 1794 a French squadron captured Tamerlane, Richardson, master, on the Newfoundland Banks as she was sailing from Jamaica to London. The French burnt Tamerlane and took her crew to France.

Citations

References
 

1769 ships
Ships built in Bermuda
Age of Sail merchant ships of England
Whaling ships
Liverpool slave ships
Captured ships